An Arsonist's Guide to Writers' Homes in New England is a 2007 novel by Brock Clarke.

Plot
The novel centers on a man who accidentally burns down the home of Emily Dickinson, and in the process, kills a couple who were making love in her bed:

During his years in prison, he and his family receive large amounts of fan mail asking that he also burn down other famous literary homes, such as those of Mark Twain and Nathaniel Hawthorne. After his release, someone unknown begins to do just that, with the hero being forced to find out who is trying to frame him by destroying the homes of celebrated writers.

Reception
The book received favorable reviews in the mainstream press on both sides of the Atlantic.

Publication details

References 

 "An Arsonist's Guide to Writers' Homes in New England", St. Louis Dispatch.

External links
 
 
 "Interview with Brock Clarke," Quiddity International Literary Journal and Public-Radio Program, November 2009

2007 American novels
Novels set in the 2000s
Novels about writers
Novels set in Massachusetts